Fontainea fugax is a shrub endemic to Queensland, in the family, Euphorbiaceae, growing up to 4 m. 
In 1997, F. fugax was considered "endangered" having been found in only in the central Burnett district and within an endangered community, threatened by weeds, repeated fires and clearing.

Description
Fontainea fugax is a dioecious shrub growing to 4 m. The stems have a clear exudate. New shoots have sparse, antrorse (upward pointing) trichomes. There are no stipules and the leaves have petioles. The upper surfaces of the leaves are dark-green and the lower surfaces, pale-green. This plant is very like Fontainea rostrata, but differs in that the base of the petiole is not swollen; the male flowers are shorter than those of F. rostrata (6-8 mm vs 11-13 mm); the number of stamens is 24 (versus 28–40); the beak of the endocarp is shorter (1-1.7 mm vs 2-3 mm) and the faces between the sutures of the endocarp are weakly corrugated  (weakly rugose versus strongly rugose).

Distribution and habitat
Fontainea fugax is known only from an area between Gayndah and  Mundubbera, in south-east Queensland, with plants growing as understorey shrubs in a semi-evergreen vine thicket dominated by Backhousia kingii.

Taxonomy and naming 
The plant was first described by Paul Irwin Forster in "Three new species of Fontainea Heckel (Euphorbiaceae) from Australia and Papua New Guinea". The holotype AQ 650045 was collected on February 9, 1994, on the Gurgeena Plateau (Burnett district, Queensland) at a height of 360 m.

The specific epithet, fugax, derives from the Latin for "fleeting" and refers to the fleeting flowering material of this species, with female flowers not having been seen.

References

External links

fugax
Malpighiales of Australia
Flora of Queensland
Taxa named by Paul Irwin Forster
Plants described in 1997